Adam Gates is a graphic designer and musician from Orinda, California.

Music

Early Years (1978-1980)
Gates played with many bands in his formative years, establishing relationships that would inform his entire musical career. Some of his early projects were Town Number Eight (with songwriter Derek Greenberg) and various hardcore punk rock bands that were all heavily influenced by the LA Hardcore sound.

Monkey Rhythm (1981-1988)
In 1981 Gates sang and played bass for Monkey Rhythm, a band started (with British guitarist Graham Clarke and drummer Chuck Risby) while attending Miramonte High School in Orinda California. With the band's musical references clearly at odds with local suburban musical tastes,  Monkey Rhythm ventured into the San Francisco club circuit, playing numerous shows at The Mabuhay Gardens, On Broadway, The Stone, Berkeley Square and many others. The band constantly toured (nationally with The Fine Young Cannibals among others) until securing a record deal with Howie Klien’s 415/CBS Music. Their debut album “This Must Be The Place” (produced by Matt Wallace) was released in 1985.

In 1987 the original band dissolved and Gates, keeping the name Monkey Rhythm, played with various local musicians and friends (Wire Trains Jeff Trott and Brian McCloud) while continuing to study Graphic Design at San Francisco State.

The Spent Poets (1989-1993)
While intermittently writing music with keyboardist John Berg (who briefly played in Monkey Rhythm) Gates started working with multi-instrumentalist Matt Winegar (who came to Gates’ attention after being recommended by his friend Les Claypool). Gates and Winegar developed a fruitful working relationship, which had them sequestered away in Winegars Fremont CA home for months, recording on a primitive Tascam 388. The musical pair slowly developed their melodic pop style while amassing a large collection of original songs. With the help of Matt Wallace the duo (With Keyboardist John Berg) secured a publishing deal with publishing giant Peer Music.

While still tentatively using the name Monkey Rhythm, Gates, Berg and Winegar created a live band (with drummer Mike Urbano and bassist, and old friend, Derek Greenberg on bass). The band soon generated interest from various labels until signing with Geffen Records. The band soon after changed their name to “The Spent Poets”.

The Spent Poets recorded their debut album for Geffen and then toured nationally with the band Live.

Soon after, members John Berg and Michael Urbano left the band, leaving the core trio of Gates, Winegar and Greenberg to record their sophomore effort “Steve" for Geffen. With their relationship with Geffen waning, the second album was never released.  "Steve" is routinely traded on the Internet and is considered by the band as their best effort.

The Filthy Ape (1995-2000)
With his interest in electronic music growing Gates released multiple albums under the name No Force Field with friends Brian “Brain” Mantea and Larry “Ler” LaLonde. Gates also worked with Turntablist DJ DISK on various 12 inch releases (including The Filthy Ape vs PhonophsychDISK and DJ Chop Chop).

Primus/Bob Cock
Gates originally met Les Claypool at the radio station "The Quake" while both musicians tried to secure air play from DJ Big Rick Stewart. Gates' band Monkey Rhythm and Claypool’s Primus would play countless shows together in the SF Bay Area. Gates also shared bass duties with Claypool for the “Thrash Metal” band Blind Illusion on a national tour in 1988, where Gates met future Primus guitarist Larry LaLonde.

While ascending rapidly in popularity, Primus would often play “acoustic” shows with Gates fronting a character named “Bob C Cock” (a name and persona initially created by Monkey Rhythm manager Jim Jones). Bob Cock would feature throughout the career of Primus, most notably at their annual New Year's Eve performances.

Gates also toured with Claypool’s band (playing six string bass) in support of his first solo album “Highball With The Devil"

On Primus “Tour De Fromage” Claypool asked Gates to develop a projection system that would allow for images to be projected on three weather balloons suspended behind the band. Gates worked closely with the video company Livid, helping to test video software that would allow for a new way to perform various video clips. Gates toured extensively with Primus for both the legs of their Tour De Fromage and is still known by industry icon /Road Manager Quake as “the only guy on my crews to ever wear a suit to work”. The projections can be seen on the live Primus DVD “Hallucino-Genetics”.

Gates played the character of bass player Steve "Aiwass" Hampton Trouzdale in Claypool's film Electric Apricot

MIRV (2001-2006)
Gates played Keyboards, Guitar and sang for the SF Bay Area band MIRV. The band (with line up Marc “MIRV” Haggard, Craig McFarland and Jeff Gomes) played local San Francisco shows to MIRV’s considerable home following and toured nationally with Les Claypool. The band would record one album with Gates (The Million Pound Bomb) which remains unreleased. Gates formally left MIRV in 2006.

Madame Blavatsky Overdrive (2006-2015)
With bassist/engineer Craig McFarland Gates started the studio project Madame Blavatsky Overdrive, which was a return to performing “progressive pop” music. As the chief songwriter, Gates and Bassist/Engineer McFarland (along with drummer Jeff Gomes) recorded a full-length album “Idiot Jones Will Have His Day” as well as the “Eris Cycle” a 5 EP Box set. They also released 3 other albums, The Courier, The Anonymous Troll, and Winston King! The albums gained considerable international attention and MBO briefly played as a live act (with guitarist MIRV, Bassist- McFarland, Drummer-Gomes and Keyboardist-Tom Muer). In 2015 all online indicators of MBO were removed from the internet (including the entire MBO catalog and a considerably sized Blog that Gates had kept for over 5 years). The MBO catalog has since resurfaced on SoundCloud.

The Black Pope Of Lafayette County (2014-)
In 2014 Adam, released a solo album called The Occult which was posted on the MBO and can now be found on youtube. In an online interview, Gates mentioned his latest project "The Black Pope Of Lafayette County” - which is a song cycle consisting of 23 songs about death”. As of this writing “The Black Pope" remains unreleased.

Graphic design
With his involvement in the music industry growing in the late 1980s Gates found the opportunity to explore one of his other major creative interests: graphic design. Gates worked on graphic treatments/layouts for many major label acts (Geffen, CBS, Warner), employing his lifelong fascination with graphic design (particularly focusing on the entertainment industry).

Gates worked extensively with the band Primus on many graphic projects including the CD-ROM for “Tales From The Punchbowl"l and later the interactive menu and packaging for their platinum-selling “Animals Should Never Act Like People” album. Gates has also created numerous merchandise designs for the band throughout their career and continues to share a close creative relationship with the band.

Prawn Song and beyond (1995-current)
With interests in diversifying their creative output, Primus members Les Claypool and Larry LaLonde and Gates started a freelance graphic design company “Prawn Song Design”. The small graphics house focused on the exploding opportunities of Web-based design in the mid-1990s, creating numerous sites for Interscope Records, Mountain Bike Magazine, and CBS Records among others. Gates left the Graphic House in 1998 and introduced emerging Artist Zoltron to his role as creative director at the company. Gates then became the Creative Director for Internet startup Liquid Audio. Gates is currently a Creative Director at Pixar Animation Studios.

Selected discography 
The Spent Poets, The Spent Poets (1992)
Steve, The Spent Poets (1993)
Highball with the Devil, Les Claypool and the Holy Mackerel (1996)
Lee's Oriental Massage 415-626-1837, No Forcefield (2000)
Stray, No Forcefield (2001)
Idiot Jones Will Have His Day, Madame Blavatsky Overdrive (2006)
The Eris Cycle, Madame Blavatsky Overdrive
The Courier, Madame Blavatsky Overdrive
The Anonymous Troll, Madame Blavatsky Overdrive
Winston King!, Madame Blavatsky Overdrive
The Filthy Ape vs PhonophsycoDISK
Tornado Of Urine
House Of Chop Chop
The Black Pope Of Lafayette County (unreleased)
MIRV: The Million Pound Bomb (unreleased)
The Occult, Adam Gates (2014)

References 

Primus (band)
American rock singers
American rock guitarists
American male guitarists
Living people
Guitarists from San Francisco
1965 births